Children of Jazz is a lost  1923 American comedy silent film directed by Jerome Storm and adapted from Harold Brighouse's play by Beulah Marie Dix. The film stars Theodore Kosloff, Ricardo Cortez, Robert Cain, Eileen Percy, Irene Dalton and Alec B. Francis. The film was released on July 8, 1923, by Paramount Pictures.

Cast 
Theodore Kosloff as Richard Forestall
Ricardo Cortez as Ted Carter
Robert Cain as Clyde Dunbar
Eileen Percy as Babs Weston
Irene Dalton as Lina Dunbar
Alec B. Francis as John Weston
Frank Currier as Adam Forestall
Snitz Edwards as Blivens
Lillian Drew as Deborah
Julie Bishop as a Child

References

External links 
 

1923 films
1920s English-language films
Silent American comedy films
1923 comedy films
Paramount Pictures films
Films directed by Jerome Storm
American black-and-white films
Lost American films
American silent feature films
1923 lost films
Lost comedy films
1920s American films